Gabazine (SR-95531) is a drug that acts as an antagonist at GABAA receptors. It is used in scientific research and has no role in medicine, as it would be expected to produce convulsions if used in humans.

Gabazine binds to the GABA recognition site of the receptor-channel complex and acts as an allosteric inhibitor of channel opening. The net effect is to reduce GABA-mediated synaptic inhibition by inhibiting chloride flux across the cell membrane, and thus inhibiting neuronal hyperpolarization. While phasic (synaptic) inhibition is gabazine-sensitive, tonic (extrasynaptic) inhibition is relatively gabazine-insensitive.

Gabazine has been found to bind to and antagonize α4βδ subunit-containing GABAA receptors, which may represent the GHB receptor.

References

GABAA receptor antagonists
GABAA-rho receptor antagonists
GHB receptor antagonists
Convulsants
Pyridazines
Phenol ethers
Carboxylic acids